The Church of San Andrés (Spanish: Iglesia de San Andrés) is a Catholic church located in the city of Toledo, in Castile-La Mancha, Spain. The building is of medieval origin, and as is common in this city, is a mix of different styles. It is protected by the heritage listing Bien de Interés Cultural.

Architecture
The architecture includes examples of Mudéjar, Gothic  and Baroque styles, the last as a result of a remodeling of the 17th century. After the last restoration traceries appeared in the facade that evoke the eclecticism of the crossing. A Visigothic relief and two Visigothic pilasters was also discovered.

As the most of the Mudéjar churches in Toledo, it presents a simple aspect.
Its main entrance, unique in Toledo, is in Almohad style bearing uncommon small green ceramic in columns on the door. The capitals are Visigothic. Its mosque past is being represented by a funeral pilaster.

During the 16th century its solid late Gothic head was added, with exterior buttresses that compensate for the considerable change in height, while its interior features a vault and palm arch ribs with honeycomb work in the transept naves.

Mummies
In the crypt of this church are 60 mummies of infants, dukes, nuns and people of popular classes, in a good state of preservation and available for the public to view.

References

External links

Mummies in Toledo in leyendasdetoledo.com  (in Spanish)

Roman Catholic churches in Toledo, Spain
Mummies
Visigothic architecture
Former mosques in Spain
Toledo
Gothic architecture in Castilla–La Mancha
Bien de Interés Cultural landmarks in the City of Toledo
12th-century Roman Catholic church buildings in Spain